Jacqueline Cako and Nina Stojanović were the defending champions, but both players chose not to participate.

Shuko Aoyama and Yang Zhaoxuan won the title, defeating Choi Ji-hee and Luksika Kumkhum in the final, 6–2, 6–3.

Seeds

Draw

Draw

References
Main Draw

Shenzhen Longhua Open - Doubles